Dan Raven is an American police drama that aired on NBC during the 1960–1961 television season. It stars Skip Homeier and Dan Barton as Los Angeles County Sheriff's Department detectives whose beat is the Sunset Strip.

Synopsis
Lieutenant Dan Raven is a Los Angeles County Sheriff's Department detective. He and his partner, Detective Sergeant Burke, work the night shift in the West Hollywood Division, where their beat is the Sunset Strip. The work brings them into frequent contact with celebrities such as singers, actors, and comedians. Perry Levitt is a magazine photographer working the Hollywood beat who frequently appears on the scene as Raven and Burke investigate crime in and around the many entertainment venues along the Strip.

Cast
 Skip Homeier...Lieutenant Dan Raven
 Dan Barton...Detective Sergeant Burke
 Quinn Redeker...Perry Levitt

Production

Screen Gems produced Dan Raven. It was the first starring role for Skip Homeier, a former child film star. The show′s setting along the Sunset Strip created an opportunity for the characters to engage with famous performers as guest stars each week. Some of the guest stars played themselves on the show, while others portrayed fictional characters.

Broadcast history

Alex McNeill′s Total Television claims that the show premiered in a 30-minute format on January 23, 1960, airing on Saturdays, then expanded to a 60-minute format beginning with the broadcast of September 23, 1960, and numerous other sources repeat this claim. According to Brooks and Marsh′s Complete Directory to Prime Time Network and Cable TV Shows, however, the show premiered on September 23, 1960 and consisted only of 60-minute episodes. The 60-minute episodes on and after September 23, 1960, are well documented, but no source provides any information on any 30-minute episodes or any episodes broadcast prior to September 23, 1960. 

The following list of episodes reflects the 60-minute episodes of Dan Raven. A total of 13 of these episodes ran from September 23, 1960, to January 6, 1961, broadcast on Fridays at 7:30 p.m. Eastern Time.

Episodes
SOURCE

References

External links
  
 Dan Raven opening credits on YouTube

1960s American drama television series
1960s American crime television series
1960 American television series debuts
1961 American television series endings
Black-and-white American television shows
NBC original programming
Television shows set in Los Angeles
English-language television shows